Abhartach (Irish for 'dwarf'), also Avartagh, is an early Irish legend, which was first collected in Patrick Weston Joyce's The Origin and History of Irish Names of Places (1870). Abhartach should not be confused with the similarly named Abartach, a figure associated with Fionn mac Cumhaill.

Legend

Alternate Version
In some modern versions of the story Abhartach rises from his grave to drink the blood of his subjects, while the chieftain who slays the revenant is named as Cathain. The hero variously consults an early Christian saint instead of a druid, and is told that Abhartach is one of the neamh-mairbh, or walking dead, and that he can only be restrained by killing him with a sword made of yew wood, burying him upside down, surrounding his grave with thorns, and placing a large stone on top of the grave.

Alternative origin of Dracula
Since 1958, it has been frequently claimed that the vampiric antagonist of Bram Stoker's novel Dracula was extensively based on the person of Vlad III, Voivode (Prince) of Walachia, also known as Vlad Țepeș ('the Impaler') after his favoured method of punishment and execution. This theory was the central theme of Radu Florescu and Raymond McNally's best-selling 1972 book, In Search of Dracula, and the notion that Vlad III and Count Dracula are one and the same has been utilised in a number of cinematic adaptations of the novel. In 1998, however, Professor Elizabeth Miller published an essay in her book, Dracula: The Shade and the Shadow, which challenged this notion, pointing out that Stoker's research notes for Dracula do not indicate that he had detailed biographical knowledge of Vlad III. She explains that while Stoker copied some information from William Wilkinson's An Account of the Principalities of Wallachia and Moldavia regarding Vlad III's patronymic, his campaign against the Turks, and his treasonous brother (Radu III, incorrectly named by Wilkinson as "Bladus"), there is no current evidence that Stoker had information regarding Vlad III's reputation for cruelty, his use of impalement as a punishment, or even his full name.

An alternative inspiration for Stoker's story was put forward by Bob Curran, lecturer in Celtic History and Folklore at the University of Ulster, Coleraine, in the Summer 2000 edition of History Ireland, a peer-reviewed journal edited by historians, where he suggested that Stoker may have derived his inspiration from the legend of Abhartach. Curran is also the author of Vampires: A Field Guide to the Creatures That Stalk the Night (2005), which recounts a more detailed version of the legend than that collected by Weston.

Recent folklore
Abhartach's grave is now known as Slaghtaverty Dolmen, and is locally referred to as "The Giant’s Grave". It comprises a large rock and two smaller rocks under a hawthorn. The dolmen is located in the townland of Slaghtaverty (Irish: Sleacht Aibheartaigh), just north of Maghera in County Londonderry, Northern Ireland.

Modern depictions
Abhartach serves as the antagonist in the 2021 Irish film Boys from County Hell where he is depicted as a tall vampire-like figure who can drain people of their blood just by being within a certain proximity of them and who was famously defeated by the chieftain Ó Catháin.

References

Aos Sí
Irish folklore
Fantasy creatures
Fairies
Irish legendary creatures
Tuatha Dé Danann
Revenants